The New York College of Podiatric Medicine (NYCPM) is a private podiatric medical college in Manhattan, New York. It is the oldest and second largest podiatric medical school in the United States.

History
Founded in 1911, NYCPM was the first podiatric medical school established in the United States. The college had its first home at 125th Street but rapidly outgrew its quarters, with three successive moves culminating in the erection in 1927 of the present College building in East Harlem, two blocks from Harlem proper. Dr. Maurice J. Lewi, a physician and educator, then serving as Secretary to the New York State Board of Examiners, was named the first president of the school.

The admission requirement for the first class in 1911 was one year of high school education. Over the years, requirements for entering students changed as the profession grew and demand for podiatric services expanded into specialized foot care and treatment programs requiring knowledge of general medical sciences, orthopedics, and surgery. Educational preparation and clinical training programs were developed to meet these requirements.

From 1939 to 1955, the college was known as the Long Island University College of Podiatry. Upon dissolution of this affiliation, the college became an independent not-for-profit institution. In 1957, it was renamed the M.J. Lewi College of Podiatry, in honor of its founder and first president. In 1972, the college received its current name, the New York College of Podiatric Medicine.

A building grant in 1976 from the U.S. Department of Health, Education and Welfare enabled the creation of a new separate clinical training facility, an expanded library, and renovations to the existing college building. Completed in 1978, the new training facility, the Foot Center of New York, provides clinical services to the community and continues to be affiliated with the college. The Foot Center of New York serves a wide and diverse patient population with more than 25,000 patient visits annually, making it the largest foot clinic in the world.

In August 2020, it was announced a membership agreement was signed to join the Touro College and University System. The transaction closed in 2022, still pending approval by the U.S. Department of Education, the New York State Department of Education, other regulators and relevant accreditors.

Academics
NYCPM's curriculum is based on the standard program of allopathic medical education in the United States: the first two years of study are confined to the medical sciences, the latter two to the study of clinical sciences. The third and fourth years feature clinical rotations at The Foot Center of New York in general podiatry, biomechanical orthopedics including gait lab, podopediatrics, physical therapy, wound care, and radiology focusing mainly on the foot and ankle. Students also rotate through affiliated NYC Health + Hospitals teaching hospital clinics located at Metropolitan Hospital, Harlem Hospital, and Lincoln Hospital for rotations in podiatry, podiatric surgery, general surgery, internal medicine, and emergency medicine. Students complete a two-week vascular surgery rotation at Mount Sinai Hospital as well.

In recent years, NYCPM has expanded into the international educational arena with twice-yearly programs for podologists from Spain; a program at Foot Center of New York for podiatry students from Canada with an affiliation with their school in Quebec; and an exchange externship at University Hospital in Kraków through an affiliation with Jagiellonian University Medical College, the oldest medical school in Poland. The college has also reached out to its surrounding community, offering foot screenings at numerous neighborhood health fairs, as well as at such events as the American Diabetes Association's annual Diabetes Expo and the Central Harlem Health Revival.

NYCPM offers a dually registered joint DPM/MPH degree, in which the Master of Public Health portion is completed at and awarded through the Icahn School of Medicine at Mount Sinai.

References

External links 
 
 Foot Center of New York

Universities and colleges in New York City
Podiatric medical schools in the United States
Universities and colleges in Manhattan
Educational institutions established in 1911
Schools of medicine in New York City
Touro University System
Private universities and colleges in New York City
1911 establishments in New York City
Education in Harlem